CCNB may stand for:

Collège communautaire du Nouveau-Brunswick
Cyclin B1